Lyons Point is a small unincorporated community in Acadia Parish, Louisiana, United States, located at the intersection of LA Hwy 1115 and Benton Road.  The community is part of the Crowley Micropolitan Statistical Area.

References

Unincorporated communities in Acadia Parish, Louisiana
Acadiana
Unincorporated communities in Louisiana